The Tiinle is a Somali clan which is also subclan of darod clan they live in kaladhac town near Waiye district and Af Urur. They are fathered with Gabtaanle, Dishiishe and Maganlabe.

References

Ethnic groups in Somalia